Eduard "Edy" Hubacher (born 15 April 1940 in Bern) is a former Swiss sportsman who competed at both the Summer and Winter Olympics.

In the 1960s he competed as shot putter, discus thrower and decathlete. He still holds the current world best shot put (19.17 meters, 10 May 1969) within a decathlon. In the early 1970s, he switched to bobsledding. At the 1972 Winter Olympics in Sapporo, he won a gold in the four-man and a bronze in the two man events.

References

External links
 Bobsleigh two-man Olympic medalists 1932-56 and since 1964
 Bobsleigh four-man Olympic medalists for 1924, 1932-56, and since 1964
 Mehrkämpfer im Unruhestand, article in the Tages-Anzeiger, 12 July 2007

1940 births
Living people
Swiss decathletes
Swiss male shot putters
Swiss male discus throwers
Athletes (track and field) at the 1968 Summer Olympics
Bobsledders at the 1972 Winter Olympics
Olympic athletes of Switzerland
Olympic bobsledders of Switzerland
Swiss male bobsledders
Olympic gold medalists for Switzerland
Olympic bronze medalists for Switzerland
Olympic medalists in bobsleigh
Medalists at the 1972 Winter Olympics
Sportspeople from Bern
20th-century Swiss people